Kenneth Spencer may refer to:

 Kenneth Abendana Spencer (1929–2005), Jamaican painter
 Kenneth A. Spencer (1902–1960), American philanthropist and businessman in the chemical industry
 Kenneth Spencer (singer) (1913–1964), American singer and actor